Artistic swimming (formerly synchronised swimming) competitions at the 2020 Summer Olympics in Tokyo, Japan featured a total of 104 athletes competing in two medal events, namely the women's duet and the women's team. The events took place in 2021 following the Games' postponement from 2020 due to the COVID-19 pandemic.

Qualification

For the team competitions, the best ranked NOC in each of the five continental championships, with the exception of the host country Japan, qualified. The remaining NOCs are able to qualify for the two highest-ranked spots at the 2019 World Aquatics Championships and the three highest-ranked spots at the Olympic Qualification Tournament. For the duet, the best ranked NOC in each of the five continental championships that did not have a qualified team is to be assured of a secured spot, while the other seven top-ranked NOCs are to be selected through the Olympic Qualification Tournament. All 10 NOCs that had already qualified in the team event automatically qualify a duet (which much consist of members of the team).

Participating nations

Competition schedule 
All times are Japan Standard Time (UTC+9).

Medalists

Medal table

Medalists

See also
Artistic swimming at the 2018 Asian Games
Artistic swimming at the 2019 Pan American Games
Artistic swimming at the 2019 World Aquatics Championships

References

External links
 Results book 

 
2021 in synchronized swimming
Synchronized swimming competitions in Japan
International aquatics competitions hosted by Japan
2020
2020 Summer Olympics events